The aluminum cycle is the biogeochemical cycle by which aluminum is moved through the environment by natural and anthropogenic processes.

Natural fluxes

Lithospheric cycle 

The majority of aluminum cycling takes place in the lithosphere via sedimentary processes, with 99.999% of aluminum cycled within the lithosphere in the form of primary and secondary minerals as well as colloidal phases. Primary aluminum-rich minerals, such as feldspars, in the Earth's crust are weathered to clay-like materials such as kaolinite. With further weathering, aluminum is transported as particulates in rivers. Clays generally have low solubility and are eventually returned to crust through sedimentation and subduction.

Biotic cycle 
Aluminum enters the biosphere through water and food and then is cycled through the food chain. Humans, animals, and plants accumulate aluminum throughout their lives as it cycled throughout the food chain. There is no evidence to support aluminum being essential to humans or in any other forms of life.

Anthropogenic influence 
Human activity has influenced the aluminum cycle in many ways. Acid rain increases weathering of the lithosphere through sulfuric acid weathering instead of the usual carbonic acid weathering. This alters the aluminum cycle by reducing the availability of silicic acid and lowering the pH of the environment. The depletion of silicic acid causes the solubility of aluminum to switch from being dependent on relatively stable hydroxyaluminosilicates to much more unstable solubility controls, such as amorphous aluminum hydroxide and organoaluminum complexes. This increased unstableness of aluminum is further enhanced by an aluminum-induced limitation of biologically available phosphate. Anthropogenic acidification of the environment and extraction of aluminum from ores has resulted in increased exposure to aluminum through diet. Aluminum in cosmetics, food, drink, and in the atmosphere have increased humans' direct contact of the metal. Recent research suggests possible link between aluminum and chronic diseases, such as Alzheimer's.

References 

Biogeochemical cycle
Aluminium